Robert J. Jones (born 1951) is a crop physiology scientist and currently the tenth chancellor of the University of Illinois Urbana-Champaign. Jones is the first African-American to hold this office. He previously served as president of the University of Albany. In addition to his academic career, Jones was a tenor singer in Sounds of Blackness, a vocal ensemble from Minneapolis/St. Paul, Minnesota that sings gospel, soul, and R&B.

Education
Jones earned a bachelor's degree in agronomy from Fort Valley State College, a master's degree in crop physiology at the University of Georgia, and a doctorate in crop physiology at the University of Missouri.

Career

University of Minnesota 
Jones worked at the University of Minnesota for 34 years in many positions: a professor in agronomy and plant genetics, executive vice provost, and senior vice president for academic administration from 2004 to 2013. The University of Minnesota's Urban Research and Outreach-Engagement Center was named after Jones.

University at Albany 
Following his career at the University of Minnesota, Jones served as the president of the University at Albany from 2013 to 2016. During his tenure, he created the College of Engineering and Applied Sciences.

Racial Assault Hoax
Jones made national headlines for presiding  over a racial hoax that was reported as a race-motivated assault against three African-American women on a campus bus. Based upon a police report at the time, Jones firmly declared in a public announcement that “early this morning, three of our students were harassed and assaulted while riding a bus in Albany. I am deeply concerned, saddened and angry about this incident. There is no place in the UAlbany community for violence, no place for racial intolerance and no place for gender violence.”. Later video evidence showed that the trio was not assaulted and were instead aggressors in the incident. Students and observers criticized Jones as rushing to judgement  while Jones refused to apologize stating that he made his remark based upon the police report at that time.

University of Illinois Urbana-Champaign
In July 2016, Jones was named as the University of Illinois' tenth chancellor. According to Jones, leaving the University of Albany was one of the most difficult decisions he had to make in his academic career. Jones also has a tenured faculty position in the College of Agricultural, Consumer, and Environmental Sciences in the department of crop sciences.

See also
List of chancellors of the University of Illinois Urbana–Champaign
List of University at Albany people

References

External links
Full CV
Abbreviated CV

 

20th-century American scientists
21st-century American scientists
Presidents of University at Albany
University of Missouri alumni
American tenors
Leaders of the University of Illinois
University of Georgia alumni
University of Minnesota faculty
Living people
1950s births
Year of birth uncertain